Lemvig Airfield is a recreational aerodrome 4 km south of Lemvig, Denmark.

References

Airports in Denmark
Buildings and structures in the Central Denmark Region
Transport in the Central Denmark Region
Lemvig Municipality